The final round of the 1950 FIFA World Cup took place from 9 to 16 July 1950. The final round consisted of Brazil, Spain, Sweden, and Uruguay. The winner of the final round was declared champions of the World Cup.

Uruguay won the tournament, defeating hosts Brazil in the decisive match for their second World Cup title.

Qualified teams
The top placed team from each of the four groups qualified for the final round.

Standings

Matches
All times listed are local time.

Uruguay vs Spain

Brazil vs Sweden

Brazil vs Spain

Uruguay vs Sweden

Sweden vs Spain

Uruguay vs Brazil

References

External links
 1950 FIFA World Cup archive

1950 FIFA World Cup
Brazil at the 1950 FIFA World Cup
Spain at the 1950 FIFA World Cup
Uruguay at the 1950 FIFA World Cup
Sweden at the 1950 FIFA World Cup